A Better World may refer to:
 A Better World (organization), charitable organization based in Lacombe, Alberta, Canada
 A Better World (album), 2016 album by Chris de Burgh
 A Better World, 2014 novel by Marcus Sakey
 A Better World, poem by James Patrick Kinney
 In a Better World, drama thriller film written by Anders Thomas Jensen

See also 
 Better World (disambiguation)